Seaside, New Jersey may refer to one of the following municipalities in Ocean County, New Jersey:

 Seaside Heights, New Jersey
 Seaside Park, New Jersey